Villebernier is a commune in the Maine-et-Loire department in western France. It is located on the Northern bank of the Loire river, between Angers and Tours.

A couple of architectural treasures can be found in the village. A Romanesque church and the manor of Launay was built by Roi René in 1414. The chapel Notre-Dame-des-Eaux, built in 1843 by priest Théar, has a unique round architecture.

In 2018, the village had 1464 inhabitants.

See also
Communes of the Maine-et-Loire department

References 

Communes of Maine-et-Loire